The 2014 Moldovan Super Cup was the eighth Moldovan Super Cup, an annual Moldovan football match played by the winner of the national football league (the National Division) and the winner of the national Cup. The match was played between Zimbru Chișinău, winners of the 2013–14 Moldovan Cup, and Sheriff Tiraspol, champions of the 2013–14 National Division. It was  held at the Sheriff Stadium on 27 June 2014.Zimbru won 4–3 on penalties, after the match finished 1–1 after 90 minutes.

Match

References

2014–15 in Moldovan football
FC Zimbru Chișinău matches
FC Sheriff Tiraspol matches
Moldovan Super Cup
Association football penalty shoot-outs